Pennsylvania State Senate District 14 includes parts of Lehigh County and Northampton County. It is currently represented by Democrat Nick Miller. Prior to the current reapportionment plan it was a Luzerne County seat that was moved to the Lehigh Valley to reflect long-term population shifts.

District profile
The district includes the following areas:

Lehigh County

 Allentown [PART, Wards 01, 02, 03, 04, 05, 06, 07, 08, 09, 10, 11, 12, 14, 15, 16, 17 and 19]
 Catasauqua
 Coplay
 Emmaus
 Fountain Hill
 Hanover Township
 Salisbury Township
 South Whitehall Township [PART, Districts 01, 02, 04, 05 and 07]
 Whitehall Township

Northampton County

 Allen Township
 Bath
 Bushkill Township
 Chapman
 East Allen Township
 Hanover Township
 Lehigh Township
 Moore Township
 North Catasauqua
 Northampton
 Walnutport

Senators

Recent election results

References

Pennsylvania Senate districts
Government of Carbon County, Pennsylvania
Government of Luzerne County, Pennsylvania